Jaypee may refer to:

 Jaypee Group, Indian conglomerate company based in Noida, Uttar Pradesh
 Jaypee Sports City, sports complex in Greater Noida, India
 Jaypee Group Circuit, motor racing circuit in Jaypee sports city
 Jaypee Institutes and Universities, private universities of the Jaypee Group in India
 Jaypee Institute of Information Technology, in Noida
 Jaypee University of Engineering and Technology, in Guna, Madhya Pradesh
 Jaypee University of Information Technology, in Solan, Himachal Pradesh
 Jaypee University, Anoopshahr, in Bulandshahr, Uttar Pradesh
 Jaypee Brothers, Indian medical publisher based in New Delhi
 Jaypee de Guzman, Filipino child actor
 Jaypee Institute (disambiguation)
 Jaypee University (disambiguation)

See also 
 JP (disambiguation)